() is a political slogan associated with the Arab Spring. The slogan first emerged during the Tunisian Revolution. The chant echoed at Avenue Habib Bourguiba in Tunis for weeks. The slogan also became used frequently during the 2011 Egyptian revolution. It was the most frequent slogan, both in graffiti and in chants in rallies, during the revolution in Egypt.

The chant was raised at the protests in Bahrain. Ash-shab yurid isqat an-nizam has been used frequently in protests across Yemen. The slogan was used in rallies across Libya at the beginning of the 2011 revolt. In March 2011, a group of youths under the age of 15 were arrested in Dera'a in southern Syria, after having sprayed ash-shab yurid isqat an-nizam graffiti. Their arrests sparked the uprising in Syria. The slogan was also used frequently in Sudan throughout the protests.

In Jordan, a youth group named "24 March" used the slogan ash-shaʻb yurīd islah an-niẓām ("the people want to reform the system"). However, the slogan later changed to ash-shab yurid isqat an-nizam in November 2012, when the government imposed a hike in the price of fuel.

In Lebanon, the slogan has been used in protests against that country's sectarian political system. In the Lebanese protests, an-nizam ("the regime") did not refer to the sectarian political order as such, but rather the government. In Palestine, a variation of the slogan,  ("the people want the division to end"), emerged in protests calling for the two main factions Fatah and Hamas to settle their differences.

Variants
Syrian Islamists have appropriated the slogan for their own purposes, altering it to “The People want the declaration of Jihad”, as well as "The Ummah wants an Islamic Caliphate".

In post-Mubarak Egypt, given the fact that the military government only partially met the demands of the revolutionaries, with the dreaded state of emergency remaining in place, some protesters started using a somewhat different version of the slogan: The people want to bring down the field marshal, referring to Field Marshal Mohamed Tantawi, the Chairman of the Supreme Council of the Armed Forces.

During the 2011 Israeli social justice protests, the slogan "The people want social justice" was used, chanted in Hebrew to the same cadence as ash-shab yurid isqat an-nizam.

Context
Uriel Abulof, professor of politics at Tel-Aviv University and a senior research fellow at Princeton University, commented:

Benoît Challand, teaching Middle Eastern politics at the University of Bologna, commented on the slogan in the following way:

Rashid Khalidi, the Edward Said professor of Arab studies at Columbia University and the editor of the Journal of Palestine Studies, commented in the following manner:

See also
 El pueblo unido jamás será vencido
 Arab Spring

References

External links
News footage of Egyptian protestors using the slogan
Ash-sha'ab yurid isqat an-nizam, Bahraini song
Ash-sha'ab lubnani yurid isqat an-nizam at-ta'ifi, Lebanese song
Video from rally in Benghazi

Political catchphrases
Arab Spring
Arabic words and phrases